Black Stone Minerals, L.P., or Black Stone Minerals, is a Houston, Texas-based oil and natural gas corporation.

History
The company was founded as W.T. Carter & Bro., a lumber company, in 1876.

The company discovered the Double A Wells Field in East Texas in 1985. It began drilling oil in the late 1980s. By 1992, it acquired the land rights of the Kirby Lumber Company, founded by John Henry Kirby. Four years later, in 1996, it divested from its holdings in the Double A Wells Field.

According to Bloomberg Business, by 2014 it owned millions of acres of interests in the "Bakken/Three Forks plays, Eagle Ford Shale, Wolfcamp play, Haynesville/Bossier plays, Granite Wash play, and Fayetteville Shale, as well as in the Tuscaloosa Marine Shale and the Canyon Lime play located in 41 states and in 62 onshore basins in the continental United States."

It has been traded on the NASDAQ since 2015.

References

American companies established in 1876
Companies based in Houston
Companies listed on the Nasdaq
Oil companies of the United States
Natural gas companies of the United States
1876 establishments in Texas